Weston Field is a community sports facility in Scranton,  Pennsylvania, United States, built in about 1916 and named for Charles Weston.

References

External links

Sports venues in Pennsylvania
Buildings and structures in Scranton, Pennsylvania
Tourist attractions in Scranton, Pennsylvania
1916 establishments in Pennsylvania